Ten Portraits of Jews of the Twentieth Century is a 1980 series of ten paintings by Andy Warhol. The series consists of ten silk-screened canvases, each . Five editions of the series were made.

History 
In 1979, Warhol began working on the series which was suggested to him by art dealer Ronald Feldman. The subjects of the portraits were subsequently chosen by Feldman after consultation with the director of the art gallery of the Jewish Community Center of Greater Washington, Susan Morgenstein. Feldman had originally been asked by an Israeli art dealer for a series of portraits of Golda Meir. Warhol nicknamed the series "Jewish geniuses".

The series was first shown at the Jewish Community Center of Greater Washington in Rockville, Maryland in March 1980. In September 1980, it was displayed at the Lowe Art Museum at the University of Miami in Coral Gables, Florida. That series was then exhibited at the Jewish Museum of New York from September 1980 to January 1981. Following their initial exhibition, the paintings were exhibited at synagogues and Jewish institutions across the United States. The series was displayed at the National Portrait Gallery in London between January and June 2006, and returned to New York's Jewish Museum in 2008 in an exhibition called "Warhol's Jews: 10 Portraits Reconsidered". The series was exhibited at Waddesdon Manor in Buckinghamshire, England, in 2011. A set of screenprints of the series was donated to New York's Jewish Museum by Lorraine and Martin Beitler in 2006.

Critical reception
In a description of the exhibition of the paintings the National Portrait Gallery wrote that "the critical response to the [original] show was decidedly mixed and, at times, intensely hostile". The New York Times wrote in 2008 that the series was produced when Warhol's "critical reputation was at a low ebb". The Times original review by Hilton Kramer had stated that "the show is vulgar, it reeks of commercialism, and its contribution to art is nil" and that "The way it exploits its Jewish subjects without showing the slightest grasp of their significance is offensive – or would be, anyway, if the artist had not already treated so many non-Jewish subjects in the same tawdry manner". The Philadelphia Inquirer called the series "Jewploitation" and a critic for The Village Voice wrote that the show was "hypocritical, cynical and exploitative". Carrie Rickey reviewed the show more positively for Artforum, writing that "the paintings are staggering" and noted they had an "unexpected mix of cultural anthropology, portraiture, celebration of celebrity, and study of intelligentsia—all at the same time."

The National Portrait Gallery wrote in 2006 that "Magisterial in conception, they advance a new subtlety and sophistication in technical terms. One of their most compelling aspects is the way surface and image are held in a satisfying and fascinating dialogue, generating new depths of meaning and implication ... The disjunction between sitter and surface is a visual device that unites the portraits, but the series has a conceptual unity also. Warhol's insistence that the subjects be deceased invests the series with an inescapable character of mortality. The faces of the dead appear as if behind a veneer of modernity. The tension sustained between photograph and abstraction focuses the issue of their celebrity. Probing the faultlines between the person and their manufactured, surface image, Warhol presents these individuals' fame as a complex metamorphosis".

In 2008, The New York Times wrote that "What is remarkable about the paintings now, however, is how uninteresting they are. What once made them controversial – the hint of a jokey, unconscious anti-Semitism – has evaporated, leaving little more than bland, posterlike representations. The paintings do have a certain visual panache; you could even call some of them jazzy. The portrait of Sarah Bernhardt, in which her beautiful, ghostly face is layered over a square divided diagonally into blue and orange fields, with a tilting blue square floating in the orange area, is evocatively layered and disjointed" and that the perceived superficiality of the paintings was "an extension of Warhol's preoccupation with celebrity ... The issue for Warhol is not what his subjects did and not Jewishness in general. His real subject was fame. He was interested in famous people simply because they were famous".

Subjects
Actress Sarah Bernhardt
United States Supreme Court Justice Louis Brandeis
Philosopher Martin Buber
Physicist Albert Einstein
Psychologist and writer Sigmund Freud
Stage and screen comedians the Marx Brothers
Prime Minister of Israel Golda Meir
Composer and songwriter George Gershwin
Novelist Franz Kafka
Novelist and critic Gertrude Stein

References

1980 works
Paintings by Andy Warhol
Portraits by American artists
Portraits of women
20th-century portraits
Jews and Judaism in art
Cultural depictions of Albert Einstein
Louis Brandeis
Cultural depictions of Gertrude Stein
Cultural depictions of Sigmund Freud
Cultural depictions of the Marx Brothers
George Gershwin
Cultural depictions of Franz Kafka
Cultural depictions of Golda Meir